Třebenice is a municipality and village in Třebíč District in the Vysočina Region of the Czech Republic. It has about 400 inhabitants.

Administrative parts
Villages of Chroustov and Plešice are administrative parts of Třebenice.

References

Villages in Třebíč District